North Carolina Highway 144 (NC 144) is a primary state highway in the U.S. state of North Carolina. It runs from Laurel Hill to Wagram, in the North Carolina Sandhills.

Route description

A two-lane rural highway, it traverses  from Laurel Hill to Wagram.  NC 144 provides an alternate route for U.S. Route 74 (US 74) traffic to reach US 401 while avoiding Laurinburg.

History

Established in February 2002 as a new primary route connecting Laurel Hill and Wagram, unchanged since.  This is the third incarnation of NC 144.

The first NC 144 was established in 1921 as an original state highway, running from NC 14 (now NC 86) in Prospect Hill to NC 13 in Roxboro.  In 1925 it was extended west as new routing to NC 62. In 1932 NC 144 was extended northeast as new routing ending at NC 562 (now NC 96) in Virgilina. In 1936, was extended southwest as new routing to NC 61. In 1940 NC 144 was renumbered as NC 62 from NC 61 to Pleasant Grove and NC 49, from Pleasant Grove to Virgilina.

Junction list

References

Transportation in Scotland County, North Carolina
144